Heidi Antikatzidis (born 4 March 1977) is a Greek equestrian. She competed at the 2000 Summer Olympics and the 2004 Summer Olympics.

References

1977 births
Living people
Greek female equestrians
Olympic equestrians of Greece
Equestrians at the 2000 Summer Olympics
Equestrians at the 2004 Summer Olympics
Sportspeople from Athens